Isaac Nelson (1809 – 8 March 1888 ) was a Presbyterian minister and an Irish Nationalist politician.

Nelson was born in Belfast and educated at Belfast Academical Institution. In August 1837 he was ordained minister of First Comber Presbyterian Church. In 1842 he was installed in Donegall Street Presbyterian Church, Belfast.

In 1860 he published THE YEAR OF DELUSION, which denounces the 1859 Ulster Revival as an outbreak of religious hysteria and criticises the official Presbyterian Church for treating it as miraculous while concealing its less edifying experiences.   He also criticises the Irish Presbyterian Church for accepting assistance from American Presbyterian upholders of slavery.

He stood for Parliament while still minister at Donegall Street. Having been elected, he resigned his pastoral charge and served as the Irish Parliamentary Party Member of Parliament for Mayo in the House of Commons of the United Kingdom of Great Britain and Ireland from 1880 to 1885.

In November 1873, at a home rule conference in Dublin, Nelson emphasised the historical nationalism of Ulster Presbyterianism and expressed his view that no candidate in the next election would succeed without embracing home rule. His views were published in The Northern Whig Newspaper and were promptly condemned by William Johnston (not the prominent Orangeman of that name), the moderator of the General Assembly of the Presbyterian Church in Ireland. 
 
The following year, Nelson attended and addressed the fourth annual meeting of the "Home Rule Association", held in Manchester, England. In 1877, he was a founding member of the "Home Rule Confederation".

He returned to Belfast and lived there in retirement until his death in 1888.

Named building 
Nelson Memorial Church is located on the Shankill Road at Sugarfield Street which currently is a Grade B1 Listed Building. The church, in 1887 was designed by William J Gilliland who also  designed the Former Gresham Life office, Belfast by Albert Bridge, designed the Bank of Ireland building on High Street Belfast and the Crumlin Road Methodist Church.

The bust of the Rev Isaac Nelson and the two World War Plaques have are located within the Spectrum Centre of safety. Nelson Memorial Church no longer functions as a church.

References

External links 
 

1809 births
1888 deaths
UK MPs 1880–1885
Protestant Irish nationalists
Irish Parliamentary Party MPs
Members of the Parliament of the United Kingdom for County Mayo constituencies (1801–1922)
Clergy from Belfast
People educated at the Royal Belfast Academical Institution
Irish Presbyterian ministers
Politicians from Belfast